Scott is an unincorporated community in west-central Oklahoma located on the Caddo - Canadian county line.

In 1981, a violent wedge tornado  struck Scott directly causing major damage.

References

Unincorporated communities in Caddo County, Oklahoma
Unincorporated communities in Canadian County, Oklahoma
Unincorporated communities in Oklahoma